Ambadas Danve is an Indian politician and leader of Shiv Sena from Maharashtra. He is Leader of Opposition in Maharashtra Legislative Council. He is a member of Maharashtra Legislative Council representing Aurangabad-Jalana Local Authorities constituency.

Positions held
 2000: Elected as corporator in Aurangabad Municipal Corporation 
 2011: Appointed Aurangabad zhila pramukh of Shiv Sena 
 2019: Elected to Maharashtra Legislative Council

See also
 List of members of the Maharashtra Legislative Council

References

External links
 The Shivsena

Shiv Sena politicians
Members of the Maharashtra Legislative Council
Marathi politicians
Living people
Year of birth missing (living people)